Richard Parkinson is an Australian neurosurgeon. Dr Parkinson is a leading Sydney neurosurgeon who has treated several high-profile sportspeople including NRL players, and champion horserider Darren Beadman.

Dr Parkinson has led an Australia study into concussions in the NRL and has completed a two-year research paper finding an increasing trend of concussion in the NRL.

Special interest areas

 Spine and brain injuries in athletes and sportspeople 
 Minimally invasive and complex spinal surgery
 Physical rehabilitation from sports injuries, particularly in NRL and RU players
 Neurosurgical care of remote and Indigenous people

Training and lecturing

Dr Parkinson is the Supervisor for Advanced Training for Neurosurgery for the Royal Australasian College of Surgeons 2005–2010 at St Vincent's. Dr Parkinson has many peer-reviewed research papers, and he is a Conjoint Senior Lecturer at the University of Notre Dame, Sydney.

Notable patients
 Darren Beadman (jockey)
 Ben Ross (Rugby League player)
 Peter Morrissey (designer)
 Reece Williams (Rugby League player)
 Grant Denyer (TV personality)

Fellowships and affiliations
ACGME Accredited Fellowships (United States) in Minimally Invasive Spinal and Spinal Deformity Surgery, and Neurointervention (Image Guided Neurosurgery)
 Fellow of the Royal Australasian College of Surgeons (Neurosurgery)		
 Has registration both in Australia and in Illinois, USA
 Has passed the US exams (ECFMG)
 Has an Honours degree (in Spinal pathology and degeneration) (First class)

Memberships

 Australasian Board of Neurosurgery
 	Spinal Society of Australasia
 	Neurosurgical Society of Australasia
 	American Association of Neurological Surgeons
 	Royal Australasian College of Surgeons
 	St Vincents Clinic
 	Prince of Wales Hospitals
 	South Eastern Sydney Area Health Service
 	Northwestern Neurosurgery
 	Northwestern University McGaw Medical Center

Website

http://ispine.com.au

References

1 - http://www.clinic.stvincents.com.au/clinical-directory/specialists/profile/109/Dr_Richard_J_Parkinson

External links
http://sixtyminutes.ninemsn.com.au/article.aspx?id=8553849
http://www.smh.com.au/sport/surgeon-warns-of-brain-injuries-in-bodycheck-tackles-20091124-jh0h.html
http://www.smh.com.au/rugby-league/league-news/nrl-examines-threat-of-brain-damage-to-players-20100916-15ei7.html
http://www.smh.com.au/rugby-league/league-news/smart-mouths-are-the-new-messageboard-20120601-1zn4e.html
http://princeofwalesneurosurgery.com/#/prince-of-wales/4570395944
http://www.foxsports.com.au/league/ross-a-whisker-away-from-wheelchair/story-e6frf3ou-1225699484691
http://www.abc.net.au/news/2009-06-29/designer-morrissey-recovering-from-brain-surgery/1336206
http://au.news.yahoo.com/today-tonight/latest/article/-/5027402/grant-s-close-call/

Australia's next top model - The Girl That Had Back Pains
1 February 2006
 http://www.internationalhistoriansassociation.com/~internat/ihawiki/index.php?title=Australia's_Next_Top_Model,_Cycle_2

Australian neuroscientists
Australian neurosurgeons
Living people
20th-century Australian medical doctors
Year of birth missing (living people)
20th-century surgeons